Amrit Pal (c. 1941 – 2017) was an Indian actor. He died in Malad, Mumbai on 19 June 2017, aged 76.

Selected filmography

Kala Bazar (1960) as member in Dev Anand gang
Zanjeer (1973) as Tejaa Henchman
Himalay Se Ooncha (1975) as Nawab
Teesra Patthar (1976)
Main Papi Tum Bakhshanhaar (1976) as Rudhumal
Saal Solvan Chadya (1977)
Zakhmon Ke Nishan (1980)
Insaan (1982)
Horký podzim s vuní manga (1984) as Rádz
Inteha (1984) as Jaggi
Mashaal (1984) as Amrit Casino Manager
Bud Naseeb (1986)
Badkaar (1986) as Dharmesh Yogi
Jaal (1986) as Bhanu Pratap Singh
Africadalli Sheela (1986) as African Warrior
Pyaar Ke Do Pal (1986) as Amrit
Avinash (1986) as Pratap's Associate
Aadamkhor (1986) as Major Chhabra
Hiraasat (1987) as Amrit Pal - Rajesh's boss
Jai Karoli Maa (1988)
Kasam (1988) as Dharia
Waaris (1988) as Sarpanch Gurusharan Singh
Som Mangal Shani (1988) as Daku Rupa
Geeta Ki Saugandh (1988)
Aakhri Adaalat (1988) as Milkman who saw the mystery killer
Mahakali (1988)
Guru (1989) as Manu
Meri Zabaan (1989) as Jeeva
Batwara (1989) as Farmer,Jinna Brother
Hisaab Khoon Ka (1989) as Suraj's grand father
Sikka (1989) as Ship's Captain
Ladaai (1989) as Nissar Khan
Choron Ki Rani Hasino Ka Raja (1990)
Aaj Ke Shahenshah (1990)
Veeru Dada (1990) as Mahadev
Shera Shamshera (1990) as Zoravar Singh
Princess from Kathmandu (1991)
Andha Sach (1991) as Lala
Aaj Ka Inteqaam (1991)
Farishtay (1991) as Gulshanchandra /Cockroach
Lakshmanrekha (1991) as Balli
Taakre Jattan De (1991) as Chaudhary Shamsher Singh
Shikari (1991) as Hari Singh
Jungle Beauty (1991) as Kabeela Sardar
Khooni Dracula (1992)
Zulm Ki Hukumat (1992) as Tandiya
Pardesi (1993) as Biharilal Bajaj
Dhartiputra (1993) as Judge
Dushmani Jattan Di (1993) as Mehnga Singh
Jaan Per Khel Kar (1993)
Aashik Awara (1993) as Deva Singh
Yaar Gaddar (1994)
Kachehari (1994) as Ajeet's Maama
Gopalaa (1994)
Karmon Kee Sazaa (1995) as Chaudhary Saheb
Aatank Hi Aatank (1995) as Zameendar
Veergati (1995) as Abu
Ram Jaane (1995) as Mirchi
Khel Taqdeeran De (1995)
Dushmani: A Violent Love Story (1995)
7 Days (1995) as Nawab Chhote Kunwar
Border (1997)
Betaabi (1997)
Om Namah Shivay (1997, TV Series)
Jungle Love Story (1998)
24 Ghante (1998)
Maharaja (1998)
Zimbo (1999)
Shankar Shambu (1999)
Khooni No.1 (1999)
Aadhi Raat (1999)
Kothewali (2000)
Zakhmi Sherni (2001)
Woh Kaun Thi (2001)
Shaheed E Kargil (2001)
Main Hoon Qatil Jaadugarni (2001)
Kunwari Chudail (2001)
Bhooka Sher (2001)
Taqdeer Ka Sikander (2002)
Raaz Hi Raaz (2002)
Daulat Ki Hawas (2002)
Yeh Kaise Chahat Hain (2003)
Woh Hain Gumnaam (2003)
Stumped (2003) as Laltu Singh
Asa Nu Maan Watna Da: In Search of Our Roots (2004)
Chaska: An Addiction (2006)
Valley of Flowers (2006) as Yeti's Patrol
Apne (2007)
Chakk De Phatte (2008) as Sabharwal Saab
Jatt Airways (2013) as Lambu
Resham Dunkkk (2013)
47 to 84: Hun Main Kisnu Watan Kahunga (2014) as Advocate
Punjab 1984 (2014) as Man at encounter place
Sardaar Ji (2015) as Chundi
Palki (2016) as Inspector
Phillauri (2017) as Raju (final film role)

References

External links

1940s births
2017 deaths
Male actors from Mumbai
Male actors in Hindi television
20th-century Indian male actors
Male actors in Hindi cinema